Leucocelis feana is a species of chafer beetles belonging to the family Scarabaeidae.

Description
These beetles have a deep glossy green body, more or less tinged with red in some specimens. Head is longitudinally convex and sparsely punctured. Elytra are quite convex and sculptured and they show ten rows of coarse arcuate punctures. The middle and hind femora are more or less tinged with green or red.

Distribution
This species has an afrotropical distribution range (West Africa, São Tomé and Príncipe).

References

Cetoniinae
Beetles described in 1907